Skillz may refer to:

 Skillz (company), an online mobile multiplayer video game competition platform
 Skillz (rapper) (born 1974), American rapper, DJ, and producer

See also
 Skill (disambiguation)